Gleisdorf is a town in the district of Weiz in the Austrian state of Styria.

Geography
Gleisdorf lies about 25 km east of Graz in the valley of the Raab

Sister cities
 Winterbach im Remstal (near Stuttgart, since 1961)
 Nagykanizsa (Hungary)

Notable people

 Harald Ettl (born 1947), SPÖ politician
 Richard Niederbacher (born 1961), former Austrian football player

References

External links 
 Gleisdorf Cityportal

Cities and towns in Weiz District